Covariance matrix adaptation evolution strategy (CMA-ES) is a particular kind of strategy for numerical optimization. Evolution strategies (ES) are stochastic, derivative-free methods for numerical optimization  of non-linear or non-convex continuous optimization problems. They belong to the class of evolutionary algorithms and evolutionary computation.  An evolutionary algorithm is broadly based on the principle of biological evolution, namely the repeated interplay of variation (via recombination and mutation) and selection: in each generation (iteration) new individuals (candidate solutions, denoted as ) are generated by variation, usually in a stochastic way, of the current parental individuals. Then, some individuals are selected to become the parents in the next generation based on their fitness or objective function value . Like this, over the generation sequence, individuals with better and better -values are generated.

Recombination amounts to selecting a new mean value for the distribution. Mutation amounts to adding a random vector, a perturbation with zero mean. Pairwise dependencies between the variables in the distribution are represented by a covariance matrix. The covariance matrix adaptation (CMA) is a method to update the covariance matrix of this distribution. This is particularly useful if the function  is ill-conditioned.

Adaptation of the covariance matrix amounts to learning a second order model of the underlying objective function similar to the approximation of the inverse Hessian matrix in the quasi-Newton method in classical optimization. In contrast to most classical methods, fewer assumptions on the underlying objective function are made. Because only a ranking (or, equivalently, sorting) of candidate solutions is exploited, neither derivatives nor even an (explicit) objective function is required by the method. For example, the ranking could come about from pairwise competitions between the candidate solutions in a Swiss-system tournament.

Principles 

Two main principles for the adaptation of parameters of the search distribution are exploited in the CMA-ES algorithm.

First, a maximum-likelihood principle, based on the idea to increase the probability of successful candidate solutions and search steps. The mean of the distribution is updated such that the likelihood of previously successful candidate solutions is maximized. The covariance matrix of the distribution is updated (incrementally) such that the likelihood of previously successful search steps is increased. Both updates can be interpreted as a natural gradient descent. Also, in consequence, the CMA conducts an iterated principal components analysis of successful search steps while retaining all principal axes. Estimation of distribution algorithms and the Cross-Entropy Method are based on very similar ideas, but estimate (non-incrementally) the covariance matrix by maximizing the likelihood of successful solution points instead of successful search steps.

Second, two paths of the time evolution of the distribution mean of the strategy are recorded, called search or evolution paths. These paths contain significant information about the correlation between consecutive steps. Specifically, if consecutive steps are taken in a similar direction, the evolution paths become long. The evolution paths are exploited in two ways. One path is used for the covariance matrix adaptation procedure in place of single successful search steps and facilitates a possibly much faster variance increase of favorable directions. The other path is used to conduct an additional step-size control. This step-size control aims to make consecutive movements of the distribution mean orthogonal in expectation. The step-size control effectively prevents premature convergence yet allowing fast convergence to an optimum.

Algorithm 
In the following the most commonly used (μ/μw, λ)-CMA-ES is outlined, where in each iteration step a weighted combination of the μ best out of λ new candidate solutions is used to update the distribution parameters. The main loop consists of three main parts: 1) sampling of new solutions, 2) re-ordering of the sampled solutions based on their fitness, 3) update of the internal state variables based on the re-ordered samples. A pseudocode of the algorithm looks as follows.

 set   // number of samples per iteration, at least two, generally > 4
 while not terminate do  // iterate
         sample_multivariate_normal(mean, covariance_matrix)
         
      ←  with  // sort solutions
       // we need later  and        
      ← update_m  // move mean to better solutions 
      ← update_ps  // update isotropic evolution path
      ← update_pc  // update anisotropic evolution path
      ← update_C  // update covariance matrix
      ← update_sigma  // update step-size using isotropic path length
 return  or 

The order of the five update assignments is relevant:  must be updated first,  and  must be updated before , and  must be updated last. The update equations for the five state variables are specified in the following.

Given are the search space dimension  and the iteration step . The five state variables are

 , the distribution mean and current favorite solution to the optimization problem,

 , the step-size,

 , two evolution paths, initially set to the zero vector.

The iteration starts with sampling  candidate solutions  from a multivariate normal distribution , i.e. 
for 

 

The second line suggests the interpretation as unbiased perturbation (mutation) of the current favorite solution vector  (the distribution mean vector). The candidate solutions  are evaluated on the objective function  to be minimized.  Denoting the -sorted candidate solutions as

 

the new mean value is computed as

 

where the positive (recombination) weights  sum to one. Typically,  and the weights are chosen such that . The only feedback used from the objective function here and in the following is an ordering of the sampled candidate solutions due to the indices .

The step-size  is updated using cumulative step-size adaptation (CSA), sometimes also denoted as path length control. The evolution path (or search path)  is updated first.

 
 

where

  is the backward time horizon for the evolution path  and larger than one ( is reminiscent of an exponential decay constant as  where  is the associated lifetime and  the half-life),

  is the damping parameter usually close to one. For  or  the step-size remains unchanged.

The step-size  is increased if and only if  is larger than the expected value

 

and decreased if it is smaller. For this reason, the step-size update tends to make consecutive steps -conjugate, in that  after the adaptation has been successful .

Finally, the covariance matrix is updated, where again the respective evolution path is updated first.

 

 

where  denotes the transpose and

  is the backward time horizon for the evolution path  and larger than one,

  and the indicator function  evaluates to one iff  or, in other words, which is usually the case,

  makes partly up for the small variance loss in case the indicator is zero,

  is the learning rate for the rank-one update of the covariance matrix and

  is the learning rate for the rank- update of the covariance matrix and must not exceed .

This completes the iteration step.

The number of candidate samples per iteration, is not determined a priori and can vary in a wide range. Smaller values, for example , lead to more local search behavior. Larger values, for example  with default value , render the search more global. Sometimes the algorithm is repeatedly restarted with increasing  by a factor of two for each restart. Besides of setting  (or possibly  instead, if for example  is predetermined by the number of available processors), the above introduced parameters are not specific to the given objective function and therefore not meant to be modified by the user.

Example code in MATLAB/Octave
function xmin=purecmaes   % (mu/mu_w, lambda)-CMA-ES
  % --------------------  Initialization --------------------------------  
  % User defined input parameters (need to be edited)
  strfitnessfct = 'frosenbrock';  % name of objective/fitness function
  N = 20;               % number of objective variables/problem dimension
  xmean = rand(N,1);    % objective variables initial point
  sigma = 0.3;          % coordinate wise standard deviation (step size)
  stopfitness = 1e-10;  % stop if fitness < stopfitness (minimization)
  stopeval = 1e3*N^2;   % stop after stopeval number of function evaluations
  
  % Strategy parameter setting: Selection  
  lambda = 4+floor(3*log(N));  % population size, offspring number
  mu = lambda/2;               % number of parents/points for recombination
  weights = log(mu+1/2)-log(1:mu)'; % muXone array for weighted recombination
  mu = floor(mu);        
  weights = weights/sum(weights);     % normalize recombination weights array
  mueff=sum(weights)^2/sum(weights.^2); % variance-effectiveness of sum w_i x_i

  % Strategy parameter setting: Adaptation
  cc = (4+mueff/N) / (N+4 + 2*mueff/N);  % time constant for cumulation for C
  cs = (mueff+2) / (N+mueff+5);  % t-const for cumulation for sigma control
  c1 = 2 / ((N+1.3)^2+mueff);    % learning rate for rank-one update of C
  cmu = min(1-c1, 2 * (mueff-2+1/mueff) / ((N+2)^2+mueff));  % and for rank-mu update
  damps = 1 + 2*max(0, sqrt((mueff-1)/(N+1))-1) + cs; % damping for sigma 
                                                      % usually close to 1
  % Initialize dynamic (internal) strategy parameters and constants
  pc = zeros(N,1); ps = zeros(N,1);   % evolution paths for C and sigma
  B = eye(N,N);                       % B defines the coordinate system
  D = ones(N,1);                      % diagonal D defines the scaling
  C = B * diag(D.^2) * B';            % covariance matrix C
  invsqrtC = B * diag(D.^-1) * B';    % C^-1/2 
  eigeneval = 0;                      % track update of B and D
  chiN=N^0.5*(1-1/(4*N)+1/(21*N^2));  % expectation of 
                                      %   ||N(0,I)|| == norm(randn(N,1)) 
  % -------------------- Generation Loop --------------------------------
  counteval = 0;  % the next 40 lines contain the 20 lines of interesting code 
  while counteval < stopeval
    
      % Generate and evaluate lambda offspring
      for k=1:lambda
          arx(:,k) = xmean + sigma * B * (D .* randn(N,1)); % m + sig * Normal(0,C) 
          arfitness(k) = feval(strfitnessfct, arx(:,k)); % objective function call
          counteval = counteval+1;
      end
    
      % Sort by fitness and compute weighted mean into xmean
      [arfitness, arindex] = sort(arfitness); % minimization
      xold = xmean;
      xmean = arx(:,arindex(1:mu))*weights;   % recombination, new mean value
    
      % Cumulation: Update evolution paths
      ps = (1-cs)*ps ... 
            + sqrt(cs*(2-cs)*mueff) * invsqrtC * (xmean-xold) / sigma; 
      hsig = norm(ps)/sqrt(1-(1-cs)^(2*counteval/lambda))/chiN < 1.4 + 2/(N+1);
      pc = (1-cc)*pc ...
            + hsig * sqrt(cc*(2-cc)*mueff) * (xmean-xold) / sigma;

      % Adapt covariance matrix C
      artmp = (1/sigma) * (arx(:,arindex(1:mu))-repmat(xold,1,mu));
      C = (1-c1-cmu) * C ...                  % regard old matrix  
           + c1 * (pc*pc' ...                 % plus rank one update
                   + (1-hsig) * cc*(2-cc) * C) ... % minor correction if hsig==0
           + cmu * artmp * diag(weights) * artmp'; % plus rank mu update

      % Adapt step size sigma
      sigma = sigma * exp((cs/damps)*(norm(ps)/chiN - 1)); 
    
      % Decomposition of C into B*diag(D.^2)*B' (diagonalization)
      if counteval - eigeneval > lambda/(c1+cmu)/N/10  % to achieve O(N^2)
          eigeneval = counteval;
          C = triu(C) + triu(C,1)'; % enforce symmetry
          [B,D] = eig(C);           % eigen decomposition, B==normalized eigenvectors
          D = sqrt(diag(D));        % D is a vector of standard deviations now
          invsqrtC = B * diag(D.^-1) * B';
      end
    
      % Break, if fitness is good enough or condition exceeds 1e14, better termination methods are advisable 
      if arfitness(1) <= stopfitness || max(D) > 1e7 * min(D)
          break;
      end

  end % while, end generation loop

  xmin = arx(:, arindex(1)); % Return best point of last iteration.
                             % Notice that xmean is expected to be even
                             % better.
end
% ---------------------------------------------------------------  
function f=frosenbrock(x)
    if size(x,1) < 2 error('dimension must be greater one'); end
    f = 100*sum((x(1:end-1).^2 - x(2:end)).^2) + sum((x(1:end-1)-1).^2);
end

Theoretical foundations 
More considerations on the update equations of CMA-ES are made in the following.

Variable metric 
The CMA-ES implements a stochastic variable-metric method. In the very particular case of a convex-quadratic objective function

 

the covariance matrix  adapts to the inverse of the Hessian matrix , up to a scalar factor and small random fluctuations.
For selection ratio  (and hence population size ), the  selected solutions yield an empirical covariance matrix reflective of the inverse-Hessian even in evolution strategies without adaptation of the covariance matrix.

Maximum-likelihood updates 

The update equations for mean and covariance matrix maximize a likelihood while resembling an expectation-maximization algorithm. The update of the mean vector  maximizes a log-likelihood, such that

 

where

 

To see that  is independent of  remark first that this is the case for any diagonal matrix , because the coordinate-wise maximizer is independent of a scaling factor. Then, rotation of the data points or choosing  non-diagonal are equivalent.

 

See estimation of covariance matrices for details on the derivation.

Natural gradient descent in the space of sample distributions 

Akimoto et al. and Glasmachers et al. discovered independently that the update of the distribution parameters resembles the descent in direction of a sampled natural gradient of the expected objective function value  (to be minimized), where the expectation is taken under the sample distribution.
The natural gradient is independent of the parameterization of the distribution. Taken with respect to the parameters  of the sample distribution , the gradient of  can be expressed as

 

where  depends on the parameter vector . The so-called score function, indicates the relative sensitivity of  w.r.t. , and the expectation is taken with respect to the distribution .

 

Combining the previous equalities we get

 

A Monte Carlo approximation of the latter expectation takes the average over  samples from 

 

Ollivier et al.
finally found a rigorous derivation for the weights, as they are defined in the CMA-ES.

 .

These weights make the algorithm insensitive to the specific -values. More concisely, using the CDF estimator of  instead of  itself let the algorithm only depend on the ranking of -values but not on their underlying distribution. This renders the algorithm invariant to strictly increasing -transformations. Now we define

 

such that  is the density of the multivariate normal distribution . Then, we have an explicit expression for the inverse of the Fisher information matrix where  is fixed

 

and for

 

and, after some calculations, the updates in the CMA-ES turn out as

 

and

 

where mat forms the proper matrix from the respective natural gradient sub-vector. That means, setting , the CMA-ES updates descend in direction of the approximation  of the natural gradient while using different step-sizes (learning rates 1 and ) for the orthogonal parameters  and  respectively. More recent versions allow a different learning rate for the mean  as well.

Stationarity or unbiasedness 
It is comparatively easy to see that the update equations of CMA-ES satisfy some stationarity conditions, in that they are essentially unbiased. Under neutral selection, where ,  we find that

 

and under some mild additional assumptions on the initial conditions

 

and with an additional minor correction in the covariance matrix update for the case where the indicator function evaluates to zero, we find

Invariance 
Invariance properties imply uniform performance on a class of objective functions. They have been argued to be an advantage, because they allow to generalize and predict the behavior of the algorithm and therefore strengthen the meaning of empirical results obtained on single functions. The following invariance properties have been established for CMA-ES.

Any serious parameter optimization method should be translation invariant, but most methods do not exhibit all the above described invariance properties. A prominent example with the same invariance properties is the Nelder–Mead method, where the initial simplex must be chosen respectively.

Convergence 

On some functions, convergence occurs independently of the initial conditions with probability one. Informally, we can write

 

 

or similarly,

 

Yet, a rigorous proof of convergence is missing.

Interpretation as coordinate-system transformation
Using a non-identity covariance matrix for the multivariate normal distribution in evolution strategies is equivalent to a coordinate system transformation of the solution vectors, mainly because the sampling equation

can be equivalently expressed in an "encoded space" as 

The covariance matrix defines a bijective transformation (encoding) for all solution vectors into a space, where the sampling takes place with identity covariance matrix. Because the update equations in the CMA-ES are invariant under linear coordinate system transformations, the CMA-ES can be re-written as an adaptive encoding procedure applied to a simple evolution strategy with identity covariance matrix.
This adaptive encoding procedure is not confined to algorithms that sample from a multivariate normal distribution (like evolution strategies), but can in principle be applied to any iterative search method.

Performance in practice 

In contrast to most other evolutionary algorithms, the CMA-ES is, from the user's perspective, quasi-parameter-free. The user has to choose an initial solution point, and the initial step-size, . Optionally, the number of candidate samples λ (population size) can be modified by the user in order to change the characteristic search behavior (see above) and termination conditions can or should be adjusted to the problem at hand.

The CMA-ES has been empirically successful in hundreds of applications and is considered to be useful in particular on non-convex, non-separable, ill-conditioned, multi-modal or noisy objective functions. One survey of Black-Box optimizations found it outranked 31 other optimization algorithms, performing especially strong on "difficult functions" or larger dimensional search spaces. 

The search space dimension ranges typically between two and a few hundred. Assuming a black-box optimization scenario, where gradients are not available (or not useful) and function evaluations are the only considered cost of search, the CMA-ES method is likely to be outperformed by other methods in the following conditions:

 on low-dimensional functions, say , for example by the downhill simplex method or surrogate-based methods (like kriging with expected improvement);
 on separable functions without or with only negligible dependencies between the design variables in particular in the case of multi-modality or large dimension, for example by differential evolution;
 on (nearly) convex-quadratic functions with low or moderate condition number of the Hessian matrix, where BFGS or NEWUOA or SLSQP are typically at least ten times faster;

On separable functions, the performance disadvantage is likely to be most significant in that CMA-ES might not be able to find at all comparable solutions. On the other hand, on non-separable functions that are ill-conditioned or rugged or can only be solved with more than  function evaluations, the CMA-ES shows most often superior performance.

Variations and extensions 
The (1+1)-CMA-ES generates only one candidate solution per iteration step which becomes the new distribution mean if it is better than the current mean. For  the (1+1)-CMA-ES is a close variant of Gaussian adaptation. Some Natural Evolution Strategies are close variants of the CMA-ES with specific parameter settings. Natural Evolution Strategies do not utilize evolution paths (that means in CMA-ES setting ) and they formalize the update of variances and covariances on a Cholesky factor instead of a covariance matrix. The CMA-ES has also been extended to multiobjective optimization as MO-CMA-ES. Another remarkable extension has been the addition of a negative update of the covariance matrix with the so-called active CMA.
Using the additional active CMA update is considered as the default variant nowadays.

See also 
 Global optimization
 Stochastic optimization
 Derivative-free optimization
 Estimation of distribution algorithm

References

Bibliography
Hansen N, Ostermeier A (2001). Completely derandomized self-adaptation in evolution strategies. Evolutionary Computation, 9(2) pp. 159–195. 
Hansen N, Müller SD, Koumoutsakos P (2003). Reducing the time complexity of the derandomized evolution strategy with covariance matrix adaptation (CMA-ES). Evolutionary Computation, 11(1) pp. 1–18.  
Hansen N, Kern S (2004). Evaluating the CMA evolution strategy on multimodal test functions. In Xin Yao et al., editors, Parallel Problem Solving from Nature – PPSN VIII, pp. 282–291, Springer. 
Igel C, Hansen N, Roth S (2007). Covariance Matrix Adaptation for Multi-objective Optimization. Evolutionary Computation, 15(1) pp. 1–28.

External links
 A short introduction to CMA-ES by N. Hansen
 The CMA Evolution Strategy: A Tutorial
 CMA-ES source code page

Evolutionary algorithms
Stochastic optimization
Optimization algorithms and methods

fr:Stratégie d'évolution#CMA-ES